Oxford is a rural locality in the Isaac Region, Queensland, Australia.

References 

Isaac Region
Localities in Queensland